Hydatophylax is a genus of northern caddisflies in the family Limnephilidae. There are about 14 described species in Hydatophylax.

Species
These 14 species belong to the genus Hydatophylax:

 Hydatophylax argus (Harris, 1869)
 Hydatophylax festivus (Navas, 1920)
 Hydatophylax formosus Schmid, 1965
 Hydatophylax grammicus (McLachlan, 1880)
 Hydatophylax hesperus (Banks, 1914)
 Hydatophylax infumatus (McLachlan, 1865)
 Hydatophylax magnus (Martynov, 1914)
 Hydatophylax nigrovittatus (McLachlan, 1872)
 Hydatophylax primoryensis Nimmo, 1995
 Hydatophylax sakharovi Kumanski, 1991
 Hydatophylax soldatovi (Martynov, 1914)
 Hydatophylax spartacus Schmid, 1950
 Hydatophylax variabilis (Martynov, 1910)
 Hydatophylax victor Banks, 1950

References

Further reading

 
 
 

Trichoptera genera
Articles created by Qbugbot
Integripalpia